Three Women may refer to:

Film
 Three Women (1924 film), an American film directed by Ernst Lubitsch
 Three Women (1936 film) or Girl Friends, a Soviet film directed by Lev Arnshtam
 Three Women (1949 film) or Women Side by Side, a Chinese film directed by Chen Liting
 Three Women (1952 film), a French film directed by André Michel
 Three Women (1968 film), an Egyptian film written by Ihsan Abdel Quddous
 3 Women, a 1977 American film directed by Robert Altman

Other uses
 Three Women (book), a 2019 book by Lisa Taddeo
 Three Women (Boccioni), a 1909-10 painting by Umberto Boccioni
 Three Women, a 1921-22 painting by Fernand Léger, a work in the Museum of Modern Art
 Three Women, an album by Sara Hickman, Patty Mitchell Lege and Robin Macy